Barwali is a historical village in , nagaur district of the Indian state of Rajasthan.

Area 
Ramgarh 6 km, Parlika 6 km, Rajpuria 5 km, Jamal 10 km, Nethrana 5 km are the nearest villages to Barwali (11 Ntr (b) ). Barwali (11 Ntr (b) ) is bordered by Nohar Tehsil to its west, Bhadra Tehsil to its east, and Sirsa Tehsil to its north.

Education
This village was home of Dr. Chander Prakash Godara. He was the first Ph.D. holder in agriculture from Barwali. Sh Ramkishan Bhakar, who fought the assembly election from Nohar in 2003 and 2018, dr sunil bhakar also came from this village. Several MBBS doctors, teachers, and agricultural supervisors are also from Barwali. 

There is one Secondary School, One Girls middle school and one primary school from the government. It also has one private secondary school.
For further education, students moved to Ramgarh, Nohar, and Bhadra.

Colleges
Colleges near Barwali: (11 Ntr (b) )

Ndb Govt College Nohar
 PR Godara institutes in Bhadra having Agriculture Graduation.
Sanskar T.t. College Nohar

References

 Villages in Nagaur district